CECOS University of IT and Emerging Sciences is a private university in Peshawar, Pakistan. It was established in 1986 by Engr. Muhammad Tanveer Javed as a small private sector institute named CECOS Data Institute with limited resources. Currently, it offers courses in Civil engineering, Mechanical engineering, Electrical engineering, Computer science,Basic Sciences & Humanities, Architecture, Management sciences, Biotechnology and Pharmacy. The university is accredited and recognized by Pakistan Engineering Council, Higher Education Commission, Pakistan Council of Architects and Town Planners (PCATP), National Computing Education Accreditation Council (NCEAC), Pharmacy Council of Pakistan. CECOS University is also a member of Asia Pacific Quality Network (APQN) and Association of Management Development Institutions in South Asia (AMDISA).

References

1986 establishments in Pakistan
Educational institutions established in 1986
Private universities and colleges in Khyber Pakhtunkhwa
Universities and colleges in Peshawar
Hayatabad